Cultural behavior is behavior exhibited by humans (and, some would argue, by other species as well, though to a much lesser degree) that is extrasomatic or extragenetic—in other words, learned.

Learned behavior
There is a species of ant that builds nests made of leaves. To build a nest, some of these ants pull the edges of two leaves together and hold them in place, while others carry larva in their jaws and 'sew' them together with the silk they secrete. This is certainly a complex feat of engineering, but it is not cultural. This behavior is instinctive, built into the ants' behavior mechanisms. They cannot alter their plans or think of better ways to join leaves. They cannot teach or be taught to do so. 

But there are examples of animals that can learn behaviors, such as dogs and cats. A dog doesn't know instinctively not to urinate or defecate indoors, but it can be taught not to do so. Dogs are capable of learning specific behaviors.

Concepts, generalizations, abstractions and ideas
A dog's acquisition of a behavior satisfies one of the requirements of culture, but it also fulfills another. If you were to take a dog that has learned not to eliminate indoors to a different house, it would still know not to urinate there. This is because the dog has made a generalization. It knows not to urinate or defecate in any house, not just the one in which it was taught. However, this behavior only makes two of the four requirements.

Behavior shared through extragenetic transmission
For a behavior to be considered cultural it must be shared extragenetically; that is, it must be taught. If a trained dog is introduced to a puppy that doesn't know not to urinate in a house, it cannot teach it not to do so. A particularly intelligent puppy might eventually get used to not eliminate in people's houses by observing the older dog, but no active teaching would have taken place.

Contrast this with an observed group of macaque monkeys. Some scientists wanted to learn about eating behaviors in macaque monkeys, so they put some sweet potatoes on a beach near where they lived. The sweet potatoes got sandy and, as the monkeys disliked dirty food, they would spend some time picking the sand off. One young female, however started taking her potatoes to a freshwater pool to rinse off. She showed the others how to do so as well. The scientists then threw wheat on the sand, hoping the monkeys would spend more time picking the food out so they would have more time to observe them. The same young female just scooped up handfuls of wheat and sand and dumped them in the water. The sand sank and the wheat floated, which she ate. This practice also quickly spread through the group. This is what humans could call a proto-cultural behavior. It is learned, it involves concepts and generalisations, and it is taught. There is only one thing missing.

Artifacts, concrete and abstract
Cultural behavior must involve the use of artifacts. The most famous example in the animal world is the termite stick. Some chimpanzees in Tanzania have learned to fish termites out of their nests using sticks. They select a stick and modify it to fit down an opening in a termite nest, insert it, wiggle it around and withdraw it, eating the termites that have attacked the stick and stuck to it. This fits our criteria for cultural behavior. It is not genetically programmed. Not all chimpanzees do it, as would happen if it were built into their genes. It involves several complex generalisations and ideas, involving understanding the termites' behavior and how to exploit it, and conceiving of a tool with which to do so. It is taught by mother chimpanzees to their offspring and involves the use of an artifact: the stick itself. 

The difference between the culture of humans and the behaviors exhibited by others is that humans cannot survive without culture. Everything they see, touch, interact with and think about is cultural. It is the major adaptive mechanism for humans. They cannot survive winters in upper latitudes without protective clothing and shelter, which are provided culturally. They cannot obtain food without being taught how. Whereas other organisms that exhibit cultural behavior don't necessarily need it for the perpetuation of their species, they absolutely cannot live without it. 

Language is an important element in human culture. It is the primary abstract artifact by which culture is transmitted extragenetically (fulfilling points 3 and 4). Only so few can be shown, much more must be explained. Most transmission of the knowledge, ideas, and values that make up a given culture, from the ten commandments to this entry, is done through language. Again, language is an aspect from which humans differ from other animals in degree rather than kind. Once more it is other apes who share the greatest similarities with humans. Though these primates lack the larynx structure that allows for sophisticated vocalization, there are other ways of communicating. The famous female gorilla, Koko, was taught to communicate in American sign language, and she taught it to other gorillas as well.

Culture does not mean civilization. It's not necessary to have cities in order to have a culture. Every society does the best it can with its circumstances. Any given social group, and therefore the culture that reflects it, is therefore neither more advanced nor more backward than any other; it is simply the way it is because that way works. If the circumstances should change due to environmental change, population pressure, or historical events, then the culture changes. From an anthropological perspective, none is wrong, and none is right.

See also
 Cultural competence
 Culture theory
 Cultureme
 Diversity marketing
 Intercultural relations
 Social relation

Cultural anthropology